The Kuot language, or Panaras, is a language isolate, the only non-Austronesian language spoken on the island of New Ireland, Papua New Guinea. Lindström (2002: 30) estimates that there are 1,500 fluent speakers of Kuot. Perhaps due to the small speaker base, there are no significant dialects present within Kuot. It is spoken in 10 villages, including Panaras village of Sentral Niu Ailan Rural LLG in New Ireland Province.

Locations
Kuot is spoken in the following 10 villages. The first five villages are located eastern coast, and the last five on the western coast in New Ireland. Geographical coordinates are also provided for each village.
Kama
Bol (mixed with Nalik speakers)
Fanafiliuo
Liedan
Kabi
Naiama
Panaras
Naliut
Nakalakalap
Patlangat
Bimun

Combined, the two villages of Naliut and Nakalakalap are known as Neiruaran. Most of the villages are located in Sentral Niu Ailan Rural LLG, though some of the eastern villages, such as Kama and Bol, are located in Tikana Rural LLG.

The Kuot variety described by Lindström (2002) is that of Bimun village.

Language contact
Lenition in some Austronesian languages of New Ireland, namely Lamasong, Madak, Barok, Nalik, and Kara, may have diffused via influence from Kuot (Ross 1994: 566).

Status
Kuot is an endangered language and most children, if not all, grow up speaking Tok Pisin instead.

Phonology

Consonants

Vowels

The vowels /i/ and /u/ tend to become glide-vowels in occurrence with other vowels. The length of the vowels is not making differences for the meaning of words. The appearance of /i/ and /u/ with other vowels can not be seen as diphthong or a combination of vowel and glide-vowel. There are never more than three vowels per syllable. The combination of diphthong and vowel is also possible but they are pronounced in conditions of the syllable. Diphthongs are spoken like one sound.

Allophones

Morphophonemic Alternations

't' to 'r' Alternation

The phoneme  in certain possessive markers, such as "-tuaŋ", "-tuŋ" and "-tuo" becomes  when it comes after a stem ending in a vowel.  Compare:

 ira-ruaŋ – my father
 luguan-tuaŋ  – my house
 i'rama-ruo – my eye
 nebam-tuaŋ – my feather

Vowel Shortening

Where the third person singular masculine suffix "-oŋ" is used on a noun that ends with a vowel, this vowel is typically not pronounced.  For instance, "amaŋa-oŋ" is pronounced , not .

Voicing Rule

When vowel-initial suffixes are added to stems that end in voiceless consonants, those consonants become voiced. For example:

   he splits it
   he drinks
   he prays

The phoneme  becomes , not .

   it comes out
   her eyes

Grammar
Kuot is the only Papuan language that has VSO word order, similar to Irish and Welsh. The morphology of the language is primarily agglutinative.  There are two grammatical genders, male and female, and distinction is made in the first person between singular, dual, and plural, as well as between exclusive and inclusive.

For instance, the sentence  literally means 'my father eats sweet potato'. Parak-oŋ is a continuous aspect of the verb meaning 'to eat', ira means 'father', -ruaŋ is a suffix used to indicate inalienable possession ('my father'), and kamin is a simple noun meaning 'sweet potato'.

Noun declensions
Kuot nouns can be singular, dual, or plural. Below are some noun declension paradigms in Kuot (from Stebbins, et al. (2018), based on Lindström 2002: 147–146):

{| 
! Class !! Noun root !! Gloss !! Singular !! Plural !! Dual
|-
| 1 || ‘plain’ || road || alaŋ || alaŋip || alaŋip-ien
|-
| 2 || ma || eye || irəma || irəp || irəp-ien
|-
| 3 || na || base (e.g. of tree) || muana || muap || muap-ien
|-
| 4 || bun || hen || puraibun || purailəp || purailəp-ien
|-
| 5 || bu || breadfruit tree || opəliobu || opələp || opələp-ien
|-
| 6 || uom || banana || pebuom || pebup || pebup-ien
|-
| 7 || bam || rib || binbam || binbəp || binbəp-ien
|-
| 8 || nəm || village || pianəm || pialap || pialap-ien
|-
| 9 || nim || name || bonim || bop || bop-ien
|-
| 10 || m || nit || dikkam || dikkəp || dikkəp-ien
|-
| 11 || n || weed || kaun || kaulup || kaulup-ien
|}

Vocabulary
The following basic vocabulary words are from Lindström (2008), as cited in the Trans-New Guinea database:

{| class="wikitable sortable"
! gloss !! Kuot
|-
| head || bukom
|-
| hair || kapuruma
|-
| ear || kikinəm
|-
| eye || irəma
|-
| nose || akabunima; ŋof
|-
| tooth || laukima
|-
| tongue || məlobiem
|-
| louse || ineima
|-
| dog || kapuna
|-
| bird || amani; kobeŋ
|-
| egg || dəkər; səgər
|-
| blood || oləbuan
|-
| bone || muanəm
|-
| skin || kumalip; neip; pəppək
|-
| breast || sisima
|-
| man || mikana; teima
|-
| woman || makabun
|-
| sky || panbinim
|-
| moon || uləŋ
|-
| water || burunəm; danuot
|-
| fire || kit
|-
| stone || adəs
|-
| road, path || alaŋ
|-
| name || bonim
|-
| eat || o; parak
|-
| one || namurit
|-
| two || narain
|}

See also
 East Papuan languages

References

External links
Kuot language word list at TransNewGuinea.org
Kuot Swadesh 100 Word List
Kuot word list (Austronesian Basic Vocabulary Database)

Agglutinative languages
East Papuan languages
Language isolates of New Guinea
Languages of New Ireland Province
Verb–subject–object languages
Vulnerable languages
Endangered Papuan languages
Endangered language isolates